Douglas Mountain is a summit in Okanogan County, Washington, in the United States.

Douglas Mountain was named after Douglas Joe, a local miner.

References

Mountains of Okanogan County, Washington
Mountains of Washington (state)